Dahlem can refer to:

Dahlem (Berlin), a district of Berlin, part of the borough Steglitz-Zehlendorf
Dahlem, North Rhine-Westphalia, a municipality in western Germany
Dahlem, Rhineland-Palatinate, a municipality in south-western Germany
Dahlem, Lower Saxony, a municipality in northern Germany
Dalem Konferenzen, a workshop series in Berlin

See also
 Dalem (disambiguation)